The Rural Municipality of Sherwood No. 159 is a rural municipality (RM) in the Canadian province of Saskatchewan within Census Division No. 6 and  Division No. 2. In the south-central portion of the province, it surrounds the city of Regina, the provincial capital, and forms part of the Regina census metropolitan area.

History 
The RM of Sherwood No. 159 incorporated as a rural municipality on December 11, 1911. The RM was named after the Sherwood School District No. 460, which itself was named after Sherwood, Ontario, where some of the early settlers to the area originated from.

Heritage properties
The RM has two heritage properties.
Boggy Creek School - Built in 1923 as a One-room school, the building was used as a school until 1965. After that point it was used by Regina Board of Education for an outdoor program.  The site had an older school building dating back to 1886.  The school is located 10 km northwest of Regina.  The building is of brick construction based on a Waterman-Waterbury Company design.
Normand Farm Residence - Built in 1905 as a homestead the two story residence is made from field-stone and brick.  Still in use as a residence the building is located on Zehner Road,

Geography 
The RM features heavy clay soils, making it one of the richest farming areas in the province. The Wascana Valley and Wascana Creek meander through the RM. The Sherwood Forest Bridge crosses Wascana Creek within the RM.

At the north-west corner of the RM, in the Wascana Valley, is the Wascana Trails provincial recreation site.

Communities and localities 
The following urban municipalities are surrounded by the RM.

Cities
Regina

Towns
Grand Coulee

Demographics 

Economy 
The Sherwood Industrial Park is also within the RM, which is a home to the steel manufacturer Evraz (formerly IPSCO), agricultural implement manufacturers and dealerships, trucking companies, and medical hazardous waste disposal facilities.

Government 
The RM of Sherwood No. 159 is governed by an elected municipal council and an appointed administrator that meets on the second Wednesday of every month. The reeve of the RM is Susan Oakley-Paul while its administrator is Bradley Wiebe. The RM's office is located in Regina.

References

External links 

Sherwood
Sherwood No. 159, Saskatchewan
Division No. 6, Saskatchewan